Benz Circle Flyover is a Flyover spanning the Benz Circle area in Vijayawada, India. Planned as a two-phased project, the first phase was inaugurated on 16 October 2020 by Nitin Gadkari. The flyover is expected to be wholly completed by 2022.

History 
It was included in the road-widening project and the widening of "Vijayawada- Machilipatnam Highway" after Benz Circle towards east. Forty-three pillars were constructed in the flyover-1 (first phase). The Second Flyover's  Construction was Started  on November, 5th 
2020  and Completed by November 3rd, 2021 . Opened for Public  Use  On November 6th 2021 .

See also 

 Kanaka Durga Varadhi
 Kanakadurga Flyover

References 

Buildings and structures in Vijayawada
2020 establishments in Andhra Pradesh
Road interchanges in India
Bridges and flyovers in Vijayawada